A meal voucher or luncheon voucher is a voucher for a meal given to employees as an employee benefit, allowing them to eat at outside restaurants, typically for lunch.  In many countries, meal vouchers have had favorable tax treatment.  Vouchers are typically in the form of paper tickets but are gradually being replaced by electronic vouchers in the form of a special payment card.

United Kingdom

A Luncheon Voucher (LV) was a paper ticket (voucher) used by some employees in the United Kingdom to pay for meals in private restaurants. It allowed companies to subsidise midday meals (luncheons) for their employees without having to run their own canteens.  

The scheme dates to 1946, when food rationing was still in force following the end of the war. The British government granted an extra-statutory tax concession, believing that this would help citizens afford healthy meals. Under the concession, Luncheon Vouchers were free of income tax and national insurance contributions up to the value of 3 shillings (15 pence) a day. The initial level of 2s. 3d. (11.25p, £5.01 in 2021) was increased in 1948 to level of 3/- (15p, £5.80 in 2021), but was not later adjusted for inflation. The concession was abolished as redundant, 15p per day having become a trivial amount, from 6 April 2013.

In the early days, a company that wanted to subsidise their staff lunches, but not run a canteen, had to have vouchers printed and make arrangements with one or more local restaurants to accept them. In addition, it would have to administer the scheme (for instance by checking and counting the vouchers returned from the restaurants prior to settling their account). In 1954, a businessman, John Hack, realised that a single standardised voucher acceptable across the UK would be more logical and efficient. He subsequently started the Luncheon Vouchers Company in 1955 to implement the nationwide Luncheon Voucher scheme. In 1956, nine large catering companies purchased the company, with Hack staying on as managing director. The company was bought by Accor in 1982.  Restaurants that accept the vouchers display an "LV" logo in their windows.

The vouchers were used as a form of payment in Cynthia Payne's brothel in London during the 1970s.

Belgium

Meal vouchers were introduced in Belgium in 1965. Electronic meal vouchers were introduced in 2011 and the old paper meal voucher system was phased out on January 1, 2016.

France

Meal vouchers were introduced to France in 1962 by Jacques Borel, who was inspired by Luncheon Vouchers; he called them Ticket Restaurant.  Starting in 1976, Ticket Restaurant expanded outside France, and became part of Accor in 1983.

Accor and Edenred

By 1983, Accor owned both the British Luncheon Vouchers and the French Ticket Restaurant. Accor spun off the voucher business in 1998 as Accor Services, which became Edenred in 2010.

References 

Payment systems
Employee benefits